Federico Augusto Antún Batlle (b. San Pedro de Macorís, 23 July 1952), nicknamed Quique Antún, is a Dominican politician and civil engineer the Dominican Republic. Antún is the chairman of the third largest political party in his country, the Social Christian Reformist Party.

Family background and first years 

Federico Antún Batlle was born in San Pedro de Macorís on 23 July 1952 to Altagracia Mercedes Batlle Ginebra and Federico Antún Abud.

Antún is also descended from the English King, William the Conqueror, and the Castilian King Alfonso X.

His paternal grandparents were Lebanese immigrants.

Politics 
From 2005 to 2009, he was the chairman of the Social Christian Reformist Party. On 26 January 2014 he was elected chairman again.
On 22 February 2015, he was elected as his party nominee to the 2016 presidential election.

Personal life
He is married to Liliana Milagros Hernández Muñoz and has begotten 3 children: Federico (b. 1978), Frank Augusto (b. 1982), and Jaime Augusto (b. 1984). In 2012, Antún Batlle reported in his affidavit that his net worth is of almost RD$ 40 million.

References

External links 
 Biografía del Ing. Federico Antún Batlle, Partido Reformista Social Cristiano

Living people
1952 births
Descendants of Ulises Espaillat
People from San Pedro de Macorís
Social Christian Reformist Party politicians
Presidents of political parties in the Dominican Republic
Dominican Republic people of Basque descent
Dominican Republic people of Catalan descent
Dominican Republic people of Cuban descent
Dominican Republic people of Dutch descent
Dominican Republic people of English descent
Dominican Republic people of French descent
Dominican Republic people of Italian descent
Dominican Republic people of Lebanese descent
Dominican Republic people of Peruvian descent
Dominican Republic people of Quechua descent
White Dominicans